The Los Angeles Strings were a team tennis franchise in World Team Tennis. They were owned by Jerry Buss. The Strings played their home matches at the Los Angeles Memorial Sports Arena in 1974, before moving to The Forum in Inglewood, California for the 1975 season. The Strings featured Chris Evert as a player and Ilie Năstase as the coach on their 1978 WTT championship team.

See also

 Los Angeles Strings - Current team
 World TeamTennis

References

Defunct World TeamTennis teams
Sports clubs established in 1973
Strings (1974-1978)
Strings (1974-1978)
Strings
1973 establishments in California
Sports clubs disestablished in 1978
1978 disestablishments in California